The Power of the True Love Knot is an album by Shirley Collins.

The theme of this collection of songs is "the idea of true love as a power outside society's control", as Shirley writes on the liner notes. If the first track sounds slightly like "Eleanor Rigby", this is because Bram Taylor plays cello on both of them. Two other guests are Mike Heron and Robin Williamson from The Incredible String Band. The relationship bore fruit on Shirley's next album. Anthems in Eden (1969) contains "God Dog", a song written by Robin Williamson.

The title of this album comes from the song "Lady Margaret and Sweet William". On this song, Shirley accompanies herself on 5-string dulcimer, adapted to have a banjo neck, an instrument she only ever used on this album. Three of the songs on this collection had previously been recorded on False True Lovers (1960) - "Just as the Tide Was Flowing", "Richie Story" and "The Unquiet Grave". Dolly Collins puts her stamp on "Richie Story" in her pipe organ accompaniment, a stately march as the couple in the song progress through the street to church to marry.

In 1964, Shirley had recorded Folk Roots, New Routes, which introduced eastern rhythms to English folk song. On this album, there is a vaguely Indian flavour to "Seven Yellow Gipsies" with Robin Williamson's complicated clapping, and his chanter playing on the song "The Maydens Came".

Track listing
The references after the titles below are from the three major numbering schemes for traditional folk songs, the Roud Folk Song Index, Child Ballad Numbers  and the Laws Numbers.

Personnel
 Shirley Collins - vocal, 5-string dulcimer (1,5,8,10,12)
 Dolly Collins - pipe organ (1-4,6,8-9,11,13-14)
 Bram Taylor - cello (1,9)
 Mike Heron - finger cymbals (2), African drum (2), clapping (7)
 Robin Williamson - Japanese sticks (2), tin whistle (2), chanter from Indian Shahanhai (11), clapping (7)

Shirley Collins albums
1968 albums
Albums produced by Joe Boyd
Polydor Records albums